Steve Eboh , popularly known as Ajebo, is a Nigerian actor. He is best known for his roles in the films Extreme Measure, Extreme Measure 2 and Lionheart. Apart from acting, Eboh is also a producer, television personality and a philanthropist.

Personal life
He is an indigene of Achi in Oji River LGA of Enugu State. He graduated with a mass communication degree from the University of Lagos.

Career
In 1996, he made his acting debut with the home movie Karishika and its sequel Karishika 2. Since then he continued to dominate in many local home movies. He has acted in several popular Nollywood films such as Taboo, Ikuku, Narrow Escape, Evil Passion, and The Concubines. In 2018, he appeared in the home movie Lionheart in a supportive role.

In June 2019, Eboh was announced as the brand ambassador of a Nigerian oil servicing and marketing company called 'GOVOIL'. Meanwhile, he worked as the Vice President of the Actors Guild of Nigeria (AGN), and Chairman of the National Caretaker Committee, AGN. He was also the CEO of Confirm Projects International Ltd. for a brief period.

Partial filmography

References

External links
 
 Nollywood actor turns to charity Steve Eboh Becomes Sickle Cell Ambassador

Living people
Nigerian television actors
Nigerian television personalities
University of Lagos alumni
Year of birth missing (living people)
Actors from Enugu State
Igbo actors
Nigerian philanthropists
Nigerian film producers
20th-century Nigerian actors
21st-century Nigerian actors
People from Enugu State
Nigerian chief executives
Nigerian humanitarians